Los Medanos may refer to:
Los Medanos College
Los Medanos, the Samalayuca Dune Fields
Rancho Los Medanos